The following is an incomplete list of association football clubs based in Somalia.
For a complete list see :Category:Football clubs in Somalia
Elman SC duduble

B
Badbaado (Mogadishu)
Banaadir Telecom FC (Mogadishu)
Bariga Dhexe (Afgoye)

D
Dekedaha (Mogadishu)

E
Elman FC (Mogadishu)

F
Feynuus (Mogadishu)

G
Gaadiidka FC
Gasko FC

H
[[Horseed FC duduble Aya leh

J
Jamhuuriya TB (Gaalkacyo)
Jeenyo United F.C. (Mogadishu)

M
Marine Club FC

S
Savana FC
SITT Daallo (Mogadishu)
Somali Police FC
Super Shell (Afgoye)

T
TOP FC (Mogadishu)

 
Somalia
Football clubs
Football clubs